Zagajnik  is a village in the administrative district of Gmina Nowogrodziec, within Bolesławiec County, Lower Silesian Voivodeship, in south-western Poland. 

The village has a population of 193.

References

Zagajnik